Budvanska Rivijera is a Montenegrin hotel group. It operates with hotels within the Municipality of Budva in Montenegro. It is named after the region, the name means Budva Riviera in Montenegrin language.

History
Budvanska Rivijera was established in 1990 as a shareholding company.

Hotels
 Hotel Aleksandar - Budva
 Slovenska Plaža Tourist Complex - Budva
 Hotel Miločer - Sveti Stefan
 Hotel Sveti Stefan - Sveti Stefan
 Hotel Palas - Petrovac
 Hotel Castellastva - Petrovac

External links
 
 Budva Tourist Guide

Hospitality companies of Montenegro